Elections to Fareham Borough Council took place on 6 May 2021, as part of the 2021 United Kingdom local elections. These elections were originally scheduled for 2020 but were suspended for a year due to the COVID-19 epidemic.

Following the previous elections, in 2018 the council consisted of 24 Conservatives, 5 Liberal Democrats, 1 Independent member and 1 UKIP member. Since the Conservatives regained majority control of the council in 1999, the Liberal Democrats had formed the main opposition.

Background
In January 2020, opposition Liberal Democrat councillor Shaun Cunningham left the party to sit as an independent citing the party's poor general election results.  Two months later, in March 2020, two Conservative councillors, Leslie Keeble and Keith Barton left their party. These three councillors alongside the other independent councillor Jack Englefield and the former UKIP councillor, Carolyn Heneghan, formed a new independent opposition group. In late March 2021, a dispute between council leader Sean Woodward and Geoff Fazackarley led to Fazackarley also parting with the Conservatives and joining the independent opposition group. With six members, this group has replaced the four-strong Liberal Democrat group as the main opposition on the council.

The Statement of Persons Nominated was published on 9 April 2021.

Results

Results by Ward

Fareham East

Fareham North

Fareham North West

Fareham South 

Keith Barton (Independent) was the leader of the Independent Group (6 councillors) on Fareham Council.

Fareham West

Hill Head

Locks Heath

Park Gate

Portchester East

Portchester West

Sarisbury

Stubbington

Titchfield

Titchfield Common

Warsash

References

Fareham
2021
2020s in Hampshire